James Elmer Hodges (May 12, 1926 – December 15, 2014), better known as Cotton Hodges, was an American NASCAR Grand National Series driver from Hollywood, Florida. He raced in three Grand National races between 1953 and 1963.

Racing career
Hodges was a well known local driver at the track off Hollywood Boulevard and later became one of the early NASCAR (National Association of Stock Car Racers).  He raced in NASCAR off and on from 1953 to 1963 and he participated in three races. He competed at the Daytona Beach Road Course in 1953 starting 25th and finishing 33rd. Hodges' raced in his second Grand National race at Palm Beach Speedway in 1954; he moved from his 25th starting position to finish 18th. Hodges' final NASCAR race happened in about nine years later in 1963 when he started and finished in 21st position at Fairgrounds Raceway in Birmingham, Alabama.

Personal life and death
Hodges died in Easley, South Carolina on December 15, 2014, at the age of 92.

Motorsports career results

NASCAR
(key) (Bold – Pole position awarded by qualifying time. Italics – Pole position earned by points standings or practice time. * – Most laps led.)

Grand National Series

References

External links
 

1926 births
2014 deaths
People from Hollywood, Florida
Racing drivers from Florida
Racing drivers from Miami
NASCAR drivers